Jahangeer both a giul Akhlaq]] (1941-1999), Pakistani artist
Zahoor Elahi (born 1971), Pakistani cricketer
Kamaliya Zahoor (born 1977), Ukrainian musical performer
Mohammad Zahoor (born 1955), Ukraine based British businessman of Pakistani origin
Saieen Zahoor (born 1937), Pakistani musician
Sumaira Zahoor (born 1979), Pakistani athlete

See also
Chaudhry Zahoor Elahi, Pakistani Statesman
Malik Zahoor Ahmad,  Pakistan diplomat
Syed Zahoor Qasim (born 1926), Indian marine biologist